Buszynko may refer to the following places in Koszalin County, West Pomeranian Voivodeship, Poland:

Buszynko Drugie
Buszynko Pierwsze